The National Primate Research Exhibition Hall (NPRX) is a proposed animal rights museum spearheaded by the Primate Freedom Project located in Madison, Wisconsin, United States. The museum is not yet open and is currently the subject of pending litigation over a property dispute. If opened, the Exhibition Hall intends to display exhibits, art, and educational displays regarding the controversial issue of non-human primate experimentation.

Proposed location
The proposed location of NPRX has stirred local controversy in Madison. The address of the Exhibition Hall would be 26 N. Charter St., which is only a few feet from the Harry Harlow Primate Psychology Laboratory and the Wisconsin National Primate Research Center. These are two primate labs affiliated with the University of Wisconsin–Madison. Together these labs hold over 2,000 primates for scientific research.

After the project to create the Exhibition Hall was announced, the University of Wisconsin–Madison responded by making an offer on the property in the amount of $1,000,000. The University intends to use the property to expand their primate laboratory facilities. The current property owner is attempting to sell the property to the University, despite prior promises and written agreements with animal rights activists to use the property for its original purpose.

On Monday November 27, 2006, Wisconsin District Court Judge Sarah O'Brien issued a ruling in favor of the activists, stating the original contract Charly signed was binding. She ordered Charly to convey the property to the activists and awarded them compensation for their legal fees. Attorneys for Charly and UW spokespeople have stated the decision is likely to be appealed. Rick Bogle, founder of the Primate Freedom Project, stated they intend to legally defend their rights to the property and to open the planned museum: "The university ... will probably be embarrassed to have the [animal rights] debate take place at the steps where this is going on,” Bogle said. “They will probably try to delay this every step of the way."

Joseph Kemnitz, director of the Wisconsin National Primate Research Center, stated disappointment in the judge's decision, and characterized the PFP's efforts as "an unexpected opportunity for them to cause trouble." In an interview with a campus paper, UW Associate Vice Chancellor Alan Fish called the contested property "absolutely critical" to the future of primate research at UW."

The UW intends to still pursue acquiring this property for expansion, and has not ruled out the use of condemnation and eminent domain to forcefully acquire the property.

See also
International trade in primates
Non-human primate experiments

Notes

External links 
 National Primate Research Exhibition Hall
 Color-coded satellite image of museum proximity to UW labs

Animal rights movement
Museums in Madison, Wisconsin
Failed museum proposals in the United States
Primate conservation